Karmana District (before 2003: Navoiy District) is a district of Navoiy Region in Uzbekistan. The capital lies at the town Karmana. The district consists of 5 urban-type settlements (Karmana, Malikrabot, Paxtaobod, Podkoron, Kamolot, Yoshlik) and 7 rural communities (Uyrot, Doʻrmon, Narpay, Xazora, Yangiariq, Jaloyir).

References

Navoiy Region
Districts of Uzbekistan